Robert Neil Topfer is Director of the investment and advisory firm Taemas Group and Director of the Nextt Group. He was global head of corporate and structured finance with Babcock & Brown before its demise saw shareholders lose the value of their investment, and held significant investments in Tricom and Eircom Holdings.

External links
Babcock & Brown executives broke law, writ alleges

References

Year of birth missing (living people)
Living people